Cardiff City FC Women is a women's football team based in Cardiff, Wales. It is the official Women's side of Cardiff City F.C.

The club won the Women's Welsh Premier League in 2012–13, which qualified them for the 2013–14 UEFA Women's Champions League. The team started in the qualifying round and lost all of its three matches.

History
Until the 2011–12 season the team played in the South Wales Women's League Division 1, where also the Southern Premier League teams played too. The team only entered the Premier League when the league was expanded for 2012–13 and went truly national. In its first Premier League season the team won the title on goal difference after beating Wrexham Ladies 5–2.

Current squad 
.

Titles
Women's Welsh Premier League:
 Champions (1): 2012–13
FAW Women's Cup
Champions: 2015-16, 2021-22
Runners-up: 2014–15

Record in UEFA Women's Champions League

Summary

By season

References

External links
 Cardiff City Women, CardiffCityFC.co.uk

Women's football clubs in Wales
Cardiff City F.C.
Welsh Premier Women's Football League clubs